Edward Merton Dorn (April 2, 1929 – December 10, 1999, aged 70) was an American poet and teacher often associated with the Black Mountain poets. His most famous work is Gunslinger.

Overview

Dorn was born in Villa Grove, Illinois. He grew up in rural poverty during the Great Depression. He attended a one-room schoolhouse for his first eight grades. He later studied at the University of Illinois and at Black Mountain College (1950–55). At Black Mountain he came into contact with Charles Olson, who greatly influenced his literary worldview and his sense of himself as poet.

Dorn's final examiner at Black Mountain was Robert Creeley, with whom, along with the poet Robert Duncan, Dorn became included as one of a trio of younger poets later associated with Black Mountain and with Charles Olson.

In 1951, Dorn left Black Mountain and traveled to the Pacific Northwest, where he did manual labor and met his first wife, Helene; they returned to the school in late 1954. After graduation and two years of travel, Dorn's family settled in Washington state, the setting for his autobiographical novel By the Sound (originally published as Rites of Passage), which describes the grinding poverty of life in "the basement stratum of society."  In 1961 he accepted his first teaching job at Idaho State University, where he published the magazine Wild Dog. His first book of poetry, The Newly Fallen, was published by LeRoi Jones's Totem Press in 1961.

In 1965, with the photographer Leroy Lucas, Dorn spent the summer visiting Indian reservations for a book commissioned by William Morrow & Co. Press, The Shoshoneans.  That fall, British poet and scholar Donald Davie invited him to join the faculty at the Literature Department he was creating at the new University of Essex. He spent most of the next five years in England, where he published several collections of poems and wrote Book 1 of Gunslinger.  He also started working with Gordon Brotherston on translations from Latin American texts, solidified his close friendship with British poet J.H. Prynne, and met his second wife, Jennifer Dunbar.

On returning to the United States, Dorn spent the 1970s as an academic migrant, teaching at over half a dozen universities across the country. In San Francisco, he collaborated with the printer and artist team of (Holbrook) Teter and (Michael) Myers on a number of projects, including the Bean News, the comic book format of Recollections of Gran Apachería''', and the typesetting of the complete Gunslinger in 1974.  In 1977 Dorn accepted a professorship at the University of Colorado at Boulder, where he taught for the rest of his life, directing the Creative Writing Program and editing the literary newspaper Rolling Stock (motto: “If It Moves Print It”) with his wife Jennifer.

Dorn was openly homophobic. His 1984 poem "Aid(e) Memoire" warned that those who "screw and are screwed...drink directly from the sewer." He inaugurated the "Aids Award for Poetry" in the same year, giving it to several leading gay poets.

During the 1990s, after a teaching exchange visit to Paul Valery University in Montpellier inspired an interest in the Cathars of Southern France, he started working on Languedoc Variorum: A Defense of Heresy and Heretics. He was also writing another long narrative poem Westward Haut. During the last two and a half years of his life, he wrote the poems for the posthumously published Chemo Sabe, reporting on his cancer treatments.

Dorn's main work, his magnum opus, is Gunslinger. Gunslinger is a long poem in five sections. Part 1 was first published in 1968, and the final complete text appeared in 1974. Other important publications include The Collected Poems: 1956-1974 (1975), Recollections of Gran Apacheria (1975), Abhorrences (1989), High West Rendezvous: A Sampler (1997), and [Way More West: New and Selected Poems] (2008).

Popular horror novelist Stephen King admired Dorn, describing his poetry as "talismans of perfect writing" and even naming the first novel of The Dark Tower series, "The Gunslinger," in honor of Dorn's poem. King opened both the prologue and epilogue of "The Stand" with Dorn's line, "We need help, the Poet reckoned."

Death
Dorn died of pancreatic cancer on December 10, 1999 in Denver, Colorado. His papers are collected at the University of Connecticut as well as at Indiana University at Bloomington.

Dorn's teaching career
During his life, Dorn taught at a number of institutions of higher learning, including Idaho State University at Pocatello (1961–65); the University of Essex in England (1965-1970) as a Fulbright lecturer; Northeastern Illinois University at Chicago (1970-1971); Kent State University, Ohio (1973–74); and the University of Colorado (1977-1999). His second wife, Jennifer Dunbar Dorn, is an Englishwoman he met during his Essex-years.

In the early 1970s, as a visiting poet at Kent State University, Dorn, along with British poet and editor Eric Mottram, was a mentor and supporter of the musical group Devo, and its founders Gerald Casale and Bob Lewis.

Works
Poetry
 1961: The Newly Fallen, Totem Press, New York. 
 1964: Hands Up!, Totem Press, New York.
 1964: From Gloucester Out, Matrix Press, London (U.K.). 
 1965: Idaho Out, Fulcrum Press, London. 
 1965: Geography, Fulcrum Press, London. 
 1967: The North Atlantic Turbine, Fulcrum Press, London. 
 1968: Gunslinger, Black Sparrow Press 
 1969: Gunslinger: Book II, Black Sparrow Press 
 1969: The Midwest Is That Space Between the Buffalo Statler and the Lawrence Eldridge, T. Williams 
 1969: The Cosmology of Finding Your Spot, Cottonwood 
 1969: Twenty-four Love Songs, Frontier Press 
 1970: Gunslinger I & II, Fulcrum Press, London. 
 1970: Songs Set Two: A Short Count, Frontier Press,  
 1971: The Cycle, Frontier Press
 1971: A Poem Called Alexander Hamilton, Tansy/Peg Leg Press 
 1971: Spectrum Breakdown: A Microbook, Athanor Books 
 1972: The Hamadryas Baboon at the Lincoln Park Zoo, Wine Press 
 1972: Gunslinger, Book III: The Winterbook, Prologue to the Great Book IV Kornerstone, Frontier Press 
 1974: Recollections of Gran Apacheria, Turtle Island 
 1974: Slinger (contains Gunslinger, Books I-IV and "The Cycle"), Wingbow Press 
 1975: With Jennifer Dunbar, Manchester Square, Permanent Press 
 1975: Collected Poems: 1956-1974, Four Seasons Foundation 
 1976: "Hello, La Jolla", No Mountains Poetry Project Broadside Series, Evanston, Il, 1976
 1978: Hello, La Jolla, Wingbow Press, 
 1978: Selected Poems, edited by Donald Allen, Grey Fox Press
 1981: Yellow Lola, Cadmus Editions 
 1983: Captain Jack's Chaps—Houston/MLA, Black Mesa Press  
 1989: Abhorrences, Black Sparrow Press
 1993: The Denver Landing, Uprising Press  
 1996: High West Rendezvous: A Sampler 2001: Chemo Sábe, Limberlost Press  
 2007: Way More West: New & Selected Poems, edited by Michael Rothenberg, Penguin Books.  (posthumous)
 2012: Westward Haut, Etruscan Books (posthumous)
 2012: Collected Poems, Carcanet Press (posthumous). 
 2015: Derelict Air: From Collected Out, Enitharmon Editions (posthumous) 

Translations
 1968: With Gordon Brotherston, Our Word: Guerilla Poems From Latin America, Grossman 
 1969: With Gordon Brotherston, Jose Emilio Pacheco, Tree Between Two Walls, Black Sparrow Press 
 1976: With Gordon Brotherston, Selected Poems of Cesar Vallejo, Penguin
 1979: With Gordon Brotherston, Image of the New World Thames & Hudson
 1999: With Gordon Brotherston, Sun Unwound: Original Texts from Occupied America, North Atlantic Books,[4] anthology

Prose, fiction and essay
 1960: What I See in the Maximus Poems, Migrant Press (criticism)
 1964:   Michael Rumaker and Warren Tallman, Prose 1, Four Seasons Foundation 
 1965: The Rites of Passage: A Brief History, Frontier Press 
 1966: The Shoshoneans: The People of the Basin-Plateau, Morrow, 66 pages
 1969:  Author of introduction, The Book of Daniel Drew [written in 1910 by Bouck White], Frontier Press 
 1969: By the Sound, Frontier Press; republished with a new preface by the author, Black Sparrow Press, 1991
 1971: Some Business Recently Transacted in the White World (short stories), Frontier Press  
 1972: Bean News (newspaper, various authors, the 'secret book' of Gunslinger), Zephyrus Image
 1976: The Poet, the People, the Spirit, Talonbooks 
 1978: Roadtesting the Language: An Interview with Ed Dorn, UC, San Diego
 1980: Interviews, Four Seasons Press
 1980: Views, Four Seasons Press
 1993: Way West: Stories, Essays and Verse accounts, 1963-1993, Black Sparrow Press, includes the previously published (1974) Recollections of Gran Apacheria
 2007: Ed Dorn Live: Lectures, Interviews, and Outtakes, edited by Joseph Richey, University of Michigan Press.  (posthumous)
 2012: Two Interviews, Shearsman Books (posthumous)

Further reading
 Beach, Christopher (1992) ABC of Influence: Ezra Pound and the Remaking of American Poetic Tradition, University of California Press.
 Clark Tom (2002) Edward Dorn: A World of Difference. Berkeley: North Atlantic Books. 
 Elmborg, James K (1998) A Pageant of Its Time: Edward Dorn's Slinger and the Sixties. Studies in Modern Poetry, Vol. 6, Peter Lang Publishing, New York.
 Levy, William (20 January 2000) "Death of a Gunslinger: An Obituary on Ed Dorn for America." Exquisite Corpse, Issue 4.
 McPheron, William (1989) Edward Dorn.  Western Writers Series #85, Boise State University.
 Paul, Sherman (1981) The Lost America of Love: Rereading Robert Creeley, Edward Dorn, and Robert Duncan. Baton Rouge: Louisiana State University Press.
 Spitzer, Mark (1996) "Dinner with Slinger," in Thus Spake the Corpse, An Exquisite Corpse Reader 1988-1998, Vol. 2 - Fictions, Travels & Translations (Codrescu, A and Rosenthal, L, eds.) Santa Rosa: Black Sparrow Press.
 Spitzer, Mark (1999) "Transcript of an Ed Dorn Rant" Jack Magazine, Issue 4.
 Streeter, David ed. (1973) A Bibliography of Ed Dorn. New York: The Phoenix Bookshop.
 Wesling, Donald, ed. (1985)Internal Resistances: The Poetry of Ed Dorn. University of California Press

References

External links

In Remembrance of Ed Dorn 
Edward Dorn, centomag.org
Preface to "Edward Dorn, American Heretic" (Chicago Review 49:3/4-50:1) 
From Gloucester Out, sorabji.com
Three poems by Dorn, thing.net 
Ed Dorn profile, epc.buffalo.edu
The Edward Dorn Papers, lib.uconn.edu/
"The Cosmology of Finding Your Spot" (poem, 1969, vlib.us
Chemo Sábe α Edward Dorn , limberlostpress.com 
Deep in Dorn Country: stepping into the poetry of Ed Dorn 
"What is not permitted is recognition": Dorn visits "Dog", earthwithcity.blogspot.com
Ed Dorn's Theatre of Impatience, pnreview.co.uk
Records of Ed Dorn are held by Simon Fraser University's Special Collections and Rare Books

1929 births
1999 deaths
Deaths from cancer in Colorado
Deaths from pancreatic cancer
People from Douglas County, Illinois
20th-century American educators
Beat Generation poets
Black Mountain poets
Kent State University faculty
Idaho State University faculty
Northeastern Illinois University faculty
University of Colorado faculty
Academics of the University of Essex
Black Mountain College alumni
University of Illinois Urbana-Champaign alumni
20th-century American poets
American Book Award winners
20th-century American male writers